Wessells is a surname. Notable people with the surname include:

Frances Wessells (born 1919), American dancer, choreographer, and associate professor
Henry W. Wessells (1809–1889), American Civil War veteran
Hunter Wessells (born  1963), American urologist and professor